Typhinae is a subfamily in the family Muricidae.

Genera 
According to the World Register of Marine Species, the subfamily Trophoninae contains 15 genera:

 Brasityphis Absalão & Santos, 2003
 Choreotyphis Iredale, 1936
 Distichotyphis Keen & Campbell, 1964
 Haustellotyphis Jousseaume, 1880
 Hirtotyphis Jousseaume, 1880

 Laevityphis Cossmann, 1903
 Lyrotyphis Jousseaume, 1880
 Monstrotyphis Habe, 1961
 Pilsbrytyphis Woodring, 1959
 Rugotyphis Vella, 1961
 Siphonochelus Jousseaume, 1880
 Trubatsa Dall, 1889
 Typhina Jousseaume, 1880
 Typhinellus Jousseaume, 1880
 Typhis Montfort, 1810
Synonyms
 † Indotyphis Keen, 1944: synonym of † Laevityphis (Indotyphis) Keen, 1944 (uncertain status)
 Talityphis Jousseaume, 1882 : synonym of Typhina Jousseaume, 1880 (junior synonym)
 Typhisala Jousseaume, 1881: synonym of Typhina Jousseaume, 1880 (junior synonym)
 Typhisopsis Jousseaume, 1880: synonym of Typhina Jousseaume, 1880 (junior synonym)

References

 Houart, R, Buge, B. & Zuccon, D. (2021). A taxonomic update of the Typhinae (Gastropoda: Muricidae) with a review of New Caledonia species and the description of new species from New Caledonia, the South China Sea and Western Australia. Journal of Conchology. 44(2): 103–147.

External links
 Cossmann, M. (1903). Essais de paléoconchologie comparée. Cinquième livraison. Paris, The author and de Rudeval. 215 pp., 9 pls.

 
Muricidae